Clontarf 1014 is a triple distilled Irish whiskey produced by the Clontarf Whiskey Company, a subsidiary of Castle Brands Inc. Originally called "Clontarf," the whiskey takes its name from the Battle of Clontarf in 1014 in which Brian Boru, the High King of Ireland, defeated an army of Vikings.

The brand has launched several marketing initiatives, including one in 2008 and most recently in 2011, when new packaging was released to highlight the 1000 year anniversary of the battle of Clontarf. Clontarf 1014 is 40%abv.

About
Clontarf 1014 is a blended Irish whiskey produced in County Cork, Ireland. It is triple distilled using a combination of grains and aged in bourbon barrels.

Clontarf 1014 also produces a single malt, as well as a reserve that is a blend of single malt and grain whiskey. All three varieties are available in the Clontarf 1014 Trinity Collection. However, only the blended whiskey is available on the American market. The reserve and the single malt are available in select European countries.

Reviews
The Clontarf 1014 single malt has generally outperformed its Reserve counterpart at international spirit ratings competitions.  The single malt received a score of 85-89 from Wine Enthusiast in 2005 (vs. 80-84 for the Reserve).  In the same time period, the single malt received a gold medal from the San Francisco World Spirits Competition, besting the silver medal earned by the Reserve.

In 2008, Clontarf 1014 Irish Whiskey received a 90 rating from the Beverage Tasting Institute, as well as a “Best Buy” award. It was described as “as spot on Irish blend with a  lot of character.”

See also
 Irish whiskey brands

References

External links
 

Irish whiskey